The Drowned and the Saved is a book of essays by Italian-Jewish author and Holocaust survivor Primo Levi on life and death in the Nazi extermination camps, drawing on his personal experience as a survivor of Auschwitz (Monowitz).
The author's last work, written in 1986, a year before his death, The Drowned and the Saved is an attempt at an analytical approach, in contrast to his earlier books If This Is a Man (1947) and The Truce (1963), which are autobiographical.

Contents
Preface
 The Memory of the Offense
 The Gray Zone
 Shame
 Communicating
 Useless Violence
 The Intellectual in Auschwitz
 Stereotypes
Letters from Germans
Conclusion

Miscellaneous
The title of one essay (The Grey Zone) was used as title for the film The Grey Zone (2001), which is based on a book by Miklós Nyiszli.

See also
 Social Darwinism

References

External links
 
 The Holocaust in popular culture

1986 non-fiction books
Personal accounts of the Holocaust
Essay collections by Primo Levi
Giulio Einaudi Editore books